The Strauss Family is a 1972 British Associated Television series of eight episodes, about the family of composers of that name, including Johann Strauss I and his sons Johann Strauss II, Eduard Strauss and Josef Strauss.

The series was written by Anthony Skene, David Reid and David Butler, and directed by David Giles, David Reid and Peter Potter

Anne Stallybrass was nominated for the British Academy Television Award for Best Actress for her portrayal of Anna Strauss.

ABC broadcast The Strauss Family in the United States from 5 May to 16 June 1973.

Episodes 

With original date of broadcast:

 "Anna" – 7 November 1972
 "Emilie" – 14 November 1972
 "Schanni" – 21 November 1972
 "Revolution" – 28 November 1972
 "Josef" – 5 December 1972
 "Hetti" – 12 December 1972
 "Lili" – 19 December 1972
 "Adele" – 19 December 1972

Cast 

Eric Woofe as Johann Strauss I
Stuart Wilson as Johann Strauss II
Nikolas Simmonds and Louis Selwyn as Josef Strauss
Tony Anholt as Eduard Strauss
Anne Stallybrass as Anna Strauss
Barbara Ferris as Emilie Trampusch
Georgina Hale as Lili Dietrich
Margaret Whiting as Hetti
Derek Jacobi as Joseph Lanner
Jane Seymour as Karoline
Christopher Benjamin as 

Most of the music was performed by members of the London Symphony Orchestra, conducted by the series' musical director Cyril Ornadel, and some played by the Band of Her Majesty's Lifeguards.

Commercial release

The series was released on DVD as a three-disc set in the United Kingdom by Acorn Media UK in 2007.

References

External links 

 

British television miniseries
Films about classical music and musicians
Films about composers
Strauss family
1970s British drama television series
1972 British television series debuts
1972 British television series endings
Television series set in the 19th century
Television shows produced by Associated Television (ATV)
English-language television shows
Cultural depictions of Johann Strauss I
Cultural depictions of Johann Strauss II
Television series set in the 1830s